Cedar Street is a common street name. It may refer to:

Cedar Street Bridge, in Illinois, United States
Cedar Street Recreation Center, New Bern, North Carolina
Cedar Street station, bus station in Newington, Connecticut
Cedar Street subway, rail tunnel in Newark, New Jersey
Cedar Street Times, newspaper in Pacific Grove, California. 
Cedar Tavern (also called Cedar Street Tavern), Greenwich Village, New York City
130 Cedar Street, building in Manhattan, New York City